Floyd Ritter (June 1, 1870 – February 7, 1943) was a catcher in Major League Baseball. He played one game for the Toledo Maumees in 1890, and had no hits in three at-bats.

Sources

1870 births
1943 deaths
Baseball players from Ohio
Major League Baseball catchers
Toledo Maumees players
19th-century baseball players
People from Ashtabula County, Ohio